Bergur Løkke Rasmussen (born 4 March 1990) is an Danish politician who serves as a Member of the European Parliament for Moderates, the party he switched to in March 2023, away from Venstre. He is the son of former Prime Minister and current Minister of Foreign Affairs, Lars Løkke Rasmussen

References

See also 

 List of members of the European Parliament for Denmark, 2019–2024

1990 births
Living people
21st-century Danish politicians
MEPs for Denmark 2019–2024
Venstre (Denmark) politicians
Venstre (Denmark) MEPs